Angelo Rea (born 16 June 1982) is an Italian footballer who is currently playing as a defender for Calcio Lecco 1912.

Career
Rea signed a 2+1 year contract with Avellino on 13 June 2015.

References

External links

1982 births
Living people
Italian footballers
U.S. Sassuolo Calcio players
A.C.R. Messina players
A.C. Cesena players
A.S.G. Nocerina players
S.S.D. Varese Calcio players
U.S. Avellino 1912 players
Serie A players
Serie B players
Sportspeople from the Province of Naples
Association football defenders
Footballers from Campania